1985–86 FIS Alpine Ski Europa Cup was the 15th season of the FIS Alpine Ski Europa Cup.

Standings

Overall

Downhill

Super G

Giant Slalom

Slalom

References

External links
 

FIS Alpine Ski Europa Cup